In tensor analysis, a mixed tensor is a tensor which is neither strictly covariant nor strictly contravariant; at least one of the indices of a mixed tensor will be a subscript (covariant) and at least one of the indices will be a superscript (contravariant).

A mixed tensor of type or valence , also written "type (M, N)", with both M > 0 and N > 0, is a tensor which has M contravariant indices and N covariant indices.  Such a tensor can be defined as a linear function which maps an (M + N)-tuple of M one-forms and N vectors to a scalar.

Changing the tensor type

Consider the following octet of related tensors:

The first one is covariant, the last one contravariant, and the remaining ones mixed.  Notationally, these tensors differ from each other by the covariance/contravariance of their indices.  A given contravariant index of a tensor can be lowered using the metric tensor , and a given covariant index can be raised using the inverse metric tensor .  Thus,  could be called the index lowering operator and  the index raising operator.

Generally, the covariant metric tensor, contracted with a tensor of type (M, N), yields a tensor of type (M − 1, N + 1), whereas its contravariant inverse, contracted with a tensor of type (M, N), yields a tensor of type (M + 1, N − 1).

Examples
As an example, a mixed tensor of type (1, 2) can be obtained by raising an index of a covariant tensor of type (0, 3),

with Kronecker  acting here like an identity matrix.

Likewise,

Raising an index of the metric tensor is equivalent to contracting it with its inverse, yielding the Kronecker delta,

so any mixed version of the metric tensor will be equal to the Kronecker delta, which will also be mixed.

See also
 Covariance and contravariance of vectors
 Einstein notation
 Ricci calculus
 Tensor (intrinsic definition)
 Two-point tensor

References

External links

 Index Gymnastics, Wolfram Alpha

Tensors